This is about the medieval title; for the migration-era Goths, see King of the Visigoths, King of the Ostrogoths.
The title of King of the Goths was for many centuries borne by both the kings of Sweden and the kings of Denmark.

In the Swedish case, the reference is to Götaland (land of the Geats), in the Danish case, to the island of Gotland (land of the Gutes).
Gotland has traditionally been interpreted as the original home of the Goths.

Migration period 

Jordanes' Getica has a number of legendary kings of the Goths predating the 4th century:  Berig (the leader of the original Goths during their migration from Scandza to Oium), and 
Filimer son of Gadaric ("about the fifth since Berig").
A Gothic leader named Cniva is recorded for the Battle of Abritus of 250.

Attila the Hun styled himself "Attila, Descendant of the Great Nimrod. Nurtured in Engaddi. By the grace of God, King of the Huns, the Goths, the Danes, and the Medes. The Dread of the World".

Swedish title 
A papal letter from about 1100 is directed to two Swedish kings—Inge the Elder and Halsten or Håkan Röde (only the initials are given)—as Kings of the Visigoths, which has been interpreted as meaning that they only ruled over Westrogothia, and had lost control over the rest of the country.

In a papal letter dated 5 September 1164, King Charles VII of Sweden (Karl Sverkersson) (c 1130–67; reigned 1161–1167) was addressed as rex Sweorum et Gothorum.

The first Swedish king to regularly use the title was King Magnus III of Sweden, particularly after he had in c 1278 had his final win over his deposed brother Valdemar who had hitherto held lands of Västergötland. First Sveriges och Götes Konung up to later decades of Gustaf I of Sweden, then Sveriges, Götes och Vendes Konung, was used in official documentation. Between 1814 and 1905 Sveriges, Norges, Götes och Vendes Konung was used, adding Norway. Sveriges, Götes och Vendes Konung was used again from 1905 up to the accession of Carl XVI Gustaf of Sweden in 1973, who was the first monarch officially proclaimed Sveriges Konung ("King of Sweden") and nothing else.

Danish title 

The first Danish king to use the title was Valdemar IV (reigned 1340 to 1375), who adopted it in 1362 after conquering Gotland the previous year. The Danish kings continued to use the title over the next six hundred years until 1972, when Queen Margrethe II succeeded. She abandoned the use of all her predecessors' titles except her title as 'Denmark's Queen', which is the royal style today.

First documented 1449, the arms of the Danish monarchs contained until 1972 a subcoat representing the title King of the Goths: on gold, a blue heraldic leopard above nine red heraldic hearts. Originally derived from the arms of the dukes of Halland which again was derived from the Danish arms. This symbol is consequently unrelated to Gotland's arms featuring the Agnus Dei, although the latter symbol was also formerly represented in the arms of Denmark.

References

Sources

Further reading 

13th-century establishments in Sweden
Goths
Danish heraldry
Swedish heraldry
Danish monarchy
Swedish monarchy